Antonitsch is an Austrian surname. Notable people with the surname include:

Alex Antonitsch (born 1966), Austrian tennis player
Mira Antonitsch (born 1998), Austrian tennis player, daughter of Alex
Nico Antonitsch (born 1991), Austrian footballer

See also